Philippe Schaaf (born 1 April 1968 in  Strasbourg) is a French team handball player.

With the French national team, he won a silver medal at the 1993 World Championship and at 1993 Mediterranean Games and a gold medal at the 1994 Goodwill Games. But at the 1996 Summer Olympics, he only placed 4th.

With clubs, he won the Coupe de France with US Ivry in 1996 and Swiss Handball League with TV Suhr in 2000. He also has been runner-up of DHB-Pokal with TV Niederwürzbach in 1998.

References

External links

1968 births
Living people
French male handball players
Olympic handball players of France
Handball players at the 1996 Summer Olympics